The 1904 Svenska Mästerskapet was the ninth season of Svenska Mästerskapet, the football Cup to determine the Swedish champions. Örgryte IS won the tournament by defeating Djurgårdens IF in the final with a 2–1 score.

Qualifying round

First round

Quarter-finals

Semi-finals

Final

References 

Print

1904
Svenska
Mas